The Daling River is a river in Northeast China.

Course
The Daling River has two sources. The southern source is Shuiquan Creek in the village of Wukunzhangzi (吴坤杖子) in Jianchang County, Liaoning. The northern source is Quanzi Creek (泉子沟) in the village of Songyingzi (宋营子) in Pingquan, Hebei. The two source streams meet at Dachengzi, Kazuo County, Liaoning. From there the river flows northeast past the city of Chaoyang into Baishi Reservoir, where it receives Mangniu River (牤牛河) from the north. The reservoir was built on the Daling River between 1995 and 2001, primarily for flood control purposes, and secondarily to supply water to nearby urban and agricultural areas. At Baishi Reservoir the river turns southeast, passing the towns of Yixian and Linghai before entering Liaodong Bay in the Bohai Sea.

History and toponymy
The Neolithic Hongshan culture flourished in the Daling River basin between 4500 and 3000 BCE, as evidenced at sites such as Niuheliang and Dongshanzui. The river was known as Bailangshui (白狼水) in the Han and Tang dynasties. It became known as the Ling River (灵河) in the Liao dynasty, which was rewritten as 凌河 in the Jin. Later it acquired the modifier "great" (大) to distinguish it from the "little" Ling River (小凌河) to its southwest.

References

Rivers of Liaoning